Hexyl cinnamaldehyde (hexyl cinnamal) is a common additive in the perfume and cosmetic industry as aroma substance. It is found naturally in the essential oil of chamomile. It is a pale yellow to yellow liquid to solid, which is nearly insoluble in water but soluble in oils. The commercial material often contains low levels of 2,6-di-tert-butyl-4-methoxyphenol as a stabilizer.

One supplier reported that its hexyl cinnamaldehyde (or "hexyl cinnamic aldehyde") contained at least 90% trans isomer.

Synthesis
Hexyl cinnamaldehyde is typically produced via crossed-aldol condensation of octanal and benzaldehyde.

Safety
Hexyl cinnamaldehyde is known to cause contact allergies in some individuals but the rate of incidence is low, with patch tests indicating ~0.1% of people to be susceptible.

References

Flavors
Conjugated aldehydes
Perfume ingredients